RAT test may refer to:

Rapid antigen test
Remote Associates Test

See also
Laboratory rat